"To the Colors" is a bugle call honoring the United States used when there is no band present, when the national anthem (The Star-Spangled Banner) cannot be played or when the national anthem has been played already but honor is to be rendered again.

The United States Armed Forces requires the same courtesies to "To the Colors" as to the national anthem.

Note that the call To the Colors is named and employed differently between US Military Branches. 

In the US Army, To the Colors is sounded at the moment the flag begins to be lowered in the evening, and is immediately preceded by "Retreat" which marks the end of the working day.   

In the US Navy, "Morning Colors" (the same call as To The Colors) is sounded the moment the flag is raised in the morning. The previously mentioned Retreat is named "Evening Colors" by the US Navy, and is played by itself. See Manual for Buglers, U.S. Navy, articles 35 and 75 pertaining to Morning and Evening Colors calls. 

In the Boy Scouts of America, To The Colors is recommended for both raising and lowering the flag (preceded by Retreat in the evening as per the US Army protocol). The Boy Scouts of America offer a Bugling Merit Badge, requiring a Scout to properly sound a choice of ten of fifteen named bugle calls, of which To the Colors is one.

See also
 United States military music customs

References

Bugle calls
North American anthems